The Chiltern Hundreds is a 1947 English-language stage comedy by William Douglas-Home, which ran for 651 performances at London's Vaudeville Theatre. It was adapted as a film in 1949, under the same title. Revivals of the play have included a 1999 production, also at the Vaudeville, starring Edward Fox.

A sequel The Manor of Northstead followed in 1954.

Original cast
Beecham -	Michael Shepley
Bessie	- Diane Hart
June Farrell - Leora Dana
June Farrell (Replacement)	- Joan Winmill
Lady Caroline Smith -	Edith Savile
Lord Pym -	Peter Coke
Mr Cleghorn -	Tom Macaulay
The Countess of Lister	- Marjorie Fielding
The Earl of Lister	- A E Matthews

Sources

1947 plays
Comedy plays
British plays adapted into films
Plays by William Douglas-Home